361st may refer to:

361st Bombardment Squadron or 1st Antisubmarine Squadron, inactive United States Air Force unit
361st Fighter Group, World War II United States Army Air Forces combat organization
361st Fighter Squadron or 461st Flight Test Squadron, United States Air Force squadron, stationed at Edwards Air Force Base, California
361st Intelligence, Surveillance and Reconnaissance Group, intelligence unit located at Hurlburt Field, Florida
361st Tactical Electronic Warfare Squadron, inactive United States Air Force unit

See also
361 (number)
361, the year 361 (CCCLXI) of the Julian calendar
361 BC